Institutional corruption is a phenomenon in public bodies that has been defined by the UK Independent Inquiry into the Murder of Daniel Morgan as placing the protection of reputation above fidelity to the truth, especially in the context of an independent or public inquiry.

The Independent Inquiry into the Murder of Daniel Morgan report found that the Metropolitan Police were "institutionally corrupt" in its handling of the investigation into the murder of Daniel Morgan and that the force had placed protecting its reputation above the investigation.

Institutional corruption is differentiated from racism or corruption by the institution's willingness to frustrate or slow the work of independent formal inquiries, even after official reports and documentation recognise that such an inquiry is necessary.

Institutional corruption is not limited to national scale institutions. It can be as small as a single recommendation of a report rejected because an institution wishes not to admit meaningful change, or the misreporting of statistics in the Stafford Hospital scandal.

Examples

United Kingdom 
 Independent Inquiry into the Murder of Daniel Morgan — 2021 report, criticising the Metropolitan Police
 Windrush scandal — 2020 report, criticising the Home Office
 Hillsborough disaster — reports in 2012, 2016 and 2017, criticising South Yorkshire and West Midlands police forces
 Stafford Hospital scandal — 2013 report, criticising Mid Staffordshire NHS Foundation Trust

Ireland 
 Mother and Baby Homes Commission of Investigation — 2021 report, criticising Catholic mother-and-baby homes and the Irish State

Canada 
 Truth and Reconciliation Commission of Canada — 2015 report, criticising the Canadian Indian residential school system, the Canadian federal government and the Royal Canadian Mounted Police

References 

Corruption